The Welsh Folk Dance Society is an organisation which supports, maintains and extends Welsh traditional dancing. It is also a registered charity.

History

Formation 
A public meeting was held in The Castle, Shrewsbury, on Saturday, July 23, 1949, where the Welsh Folk Dance Society was founded. The society was formed in order to both revive and promote old traditional Welsh dances and create new ones.

Recording dances 
After Ceinwen Thomas had left college she met Walter Dowding of the Welsh National Folk Dance Society. She told him about her mother's recollections of folk dancing in Nantgarw. He put her in touch with Doris Freeman. Together Catherine Margretta Thomas, Ceinwen Thomas and Doris Freeman worked to notate the dance steps from the traditional dances that Catherine Margretta Thomas could remember. These notes were then passed on to the Welsh National Folk Dance Society by Ceinwen Thomas.

Resurgence 
Since the founding of the Society, Welsh folk dancing in has had significant success in Wales and abroad. Workshops, lectures and courses arranged by the society typically have significant attendance. Dance events at Eisteddfod's also enjoy significant audience.

The Welsh Folk Dance Society celebrated its 70th anniversary in Pembroke on June 15, 2019. Celebrations included traditional Welsh dancing by multiple groups across Wqles in traditional clothing near Cardigan castle.

Publications 
The society has produced a number of published works including:

 Danwsiau yr ugeinfed ganrif - Twentieth century dances
 Cadw twmpath : cant arall o alawon dawnsio gwerin Cymreig = One hundred more Welsh folk dance tunes
 Dawns lleweni
 Dawnsiau bardd y brenin : circa 1785 = Dances of the king's harper
 Dawnsiau ffair Nantgarw
 Dawnsfeydd ac arferion traddodiadol yng Nghymru = Traditional dance and customs in Wales
 Tair o Fôn : Dawns y Castell, Dawns y Rhuban, Dawns y Traeth
 Rhiwfelen
 Ffair Castell-nedd = Neath Fair

References 

Welsh culture
Welsh traditions